Benjamin Cook (born 17 October 1982) is a British writer, journalist, video editor, YouTuber, and a regular contributor to Radio Times and Doctor Who Magazine. He has also been published in The Daily Telegraph, TV Times, Filmstar, Cult Times, TV Zone and The Stage, and is the author of Doctor Who: The New Audio Adventures – The Inside Story. In 2008, BBC Books published Doctor Who: The Writer's Tale, based on a year-long email correspondence between Cook and Doctor Who executive producer Russell T Davies. A revised and updated paperback edition, The Writer's Tale: The Final Chapter (featuring 350 pages of new material, extending the correspondence by another year), was published in January 2010.

He is also known for writing and directing the short film The Imp of the Perverse, starring Dan Stokes, Jake Shiels and Myles Wheeler, as well as the documentary series Becoming YouTube.

Early life 
Benjamin Cook was born in Isleworth, London, England. He went to Orleans Park School in Twickenham from 1994 to 1999. At the age of 13, in 1996, he won a competition run by BBC children's news programme Newsround. In a 2008 interview, he explained:

<blockquote>The first thing I ever wrote was for Newsround'''s Press Packers... to enter a competition, and I won that, so I got to go to the BBC for the day – and work at Radio Times for a day, which now of course, a decade later, I'm doing regularly, and getting paid for it! – so that sort of sparked my interest.</blockquote>

He went to Richmond upon Thames College from 1999 to 2001, and then, from 2002 to 2006, attended Collingwood College at the University of Durham, where he studied English Literature.

He is half Italian, and has held Italian citizenship since 2019.

 Radio Times 
For Radio Times magazine, Cook has written on E4 teen drama Skins ("The assertion that it's our job simply to reflect life is always a cop-out," co-creator Bryan Elsley told him. "But people who think it's our duty to educate young people on the correct way to live are just as bonkers"), ITV talent show The X Factor ("We weren't always fighting," Dannii Minogue confessed about ex-judge Sharon Osbourne, "but Sharon made it clear that she didn't like me, so she won't be missed. Not by me"), short-livedrama Demons ("I didn't entirely understand Demons," actor Richard Wilson told Cook. "I just had to say I did and hope no-one caught on"), the BBC's The Omid Djalili Show ("The first series was OK, but we all agreed it was there to be bettered," said Omid Djalili. "It was a bit slapdash, to be honest"), Dan Cruickshank's Adventures in Architecture and Wild China, Comedy Central's Kröd Mändoon and the Flaming Sword of Fire, as well as BBC dramas Doctor Who, The Sarah Jane Adventures, Merlin, Little Dorrit and Spooks. In 2009, Cook interviewed US boy band the Jonas Brothers for Radio Times, in which they spoke out about the controversy surrounding comedian Russell Brand's ridicule of their chastity rings at the 2008 MTV Video Music Awards: "You know what? We were happy to see he recognised their value," reasoned Joe. "You have to learn to laugh," Kevin added. The next year, Cook conducted the "first Twitter interview" with Stephen Fry, asking him how he accounted for (fellow 2010 National Television Award nominee) Piers Morgan's career: "It's pretty hard to imagine, isn't it?" replied Fry. "Biodiversity is the answer... Just as nature needs a few snakes and bugs, TV needs Piers Morgan and me!"

 Doctor Who Magazine 
Cook first wrote for Doctor Who Magazine (DWM) in March 1999. Since then, his catalogue of interviews for the publication ranges from David Tennant, Billie Piper, Kylie Minogue and Richard E Grant to Peter Kay, Charlotte Church and McFly, and the first ever major print interview with Matt Smith. Cook's regular back-page interview column, Who on Earth is..., has featured such diverse names as Bernard Cribbins, Timothy Dalton, Duncan James from Blue and Professor Richard Dawkins.

Cook has compiled six DWM Special Editions – published between 2005 and 2010, under the umbrella title In Their Own Words – providing a chronological commentary on the making of the TV series, from 1963 to 2009, by those involved in its production, collated from extracts of interviews previously published in DWM.

In 2002, Cook tracked down elusive Doctor Who scriptwriter Christopher Bailey and interviewed him for DWM. This inspired Robert Shearman to write Deadline, an acclaimed audio play starring Derek Jacobi as retired writer Martin Bannister (loosely based on Bailey) and Ian Brooker as journalist Sydney (loosely based on Cook), reporter for the fictional Juliet Bravo Magazine. In a 2004 interview, Shearman explained:

I think Deadline is in some ways inspired by the idea that he [Martin Bannister] gets tracked down by, essentially, Ben Cook. Not called Ben Cook in the play, of course – but it was actually based on DWMs Christopher Bailey interview. Here was a writer who hadn't been interviewed for many years, and was obviously not bitter about it, but had [...] his own perspective of what he wanted to say and do.

In February 2008, Cook had a contentious interview with actor Clive Swift. "I'm quite aggrieved," Swift told him. "Why should I do this? I'm not getting paid, am I?" Swift refused to answer some of Cook's questions and replied brusquely to others. When Cook asked Swift – best known for his portrayal of Richard Bucket in BBC sitcom Keeping Up Appearances – whether people shout "Richard" at him in the street, the actor replied: "Sometimes. I tell them to fuck off." The encounter ended with Swift insisting, "I know that you all think that this is a big world, this Who business. But it isn't. There are much bigger things than this." When Cook replied, "Maybe, but it means a lot to a great many of us," Swift terminated the interview.

In another controversial interview, in January 2010, outgoing Doctor Who star David Tennant told Cook:

Clearly the Labour Party is not without some issues right now [...] but they're still a better bet than the Tories. I would still rather have Gordon Brown than David Cameron. I would rather have a Prime Minister who is the cleverest person in the room than a Prime Minister who looks good in a suit. I think David Cameron is a terrifying prospect. I think he's a regional newscaster who will jump on whatever bandwagon flies past. I get quite panicked at the notion that people are buying into his rhetoric, because it seems very manipulative to me... It's very weird that you can work in the arts – which tends to be about empathy, and understanding the human condition, and hopefully feeling some kind of sympathy for your fellow man – and vote for the Tories. I do find that inconceivable.

Tennant's comments were widely reported, with Cameron offering a rebuttal on Richard Bacon's BBC Radio 5 Live show on 11 January:

Well, that's a pity, but there we are. You're never going to win over everybody. I definitely believe there's no point trying to win over everyone. Say what you think, say what you believe in, say what you believe needs to be done – and if people will come with you, they will come with you. I never give up, so maybe I'll have another go at convincing him.

 The Writer's Tale 
In 2008, BBC Books published Doctor Who: The Writer's Tale, based on an in-depth email correspondence between Cook and Doctor Who executive producer Russell T Davies, spanning February 2007 to March 2008, during production of the show's fourth series. Extracts were published in The Times on 16 and 17 September 2008, and the book itself met with positive reviews. Esther Walker of The Independent predicted that "the fans will adore it. Davies has engaged with the book totally and there is full disclosure from him about everything." The Daily Telegraph's Robert Colvile called the book "Remarkably open", adding: "Despite the self-deprecating bonhomie, there's a ruthless confidence to Davies." In a five-star review for Heat magazine, Boyd Hilton called it "a funny, revealing insight into the workings of the genius who puts the show together." In another five-star review, SFX Magazine said, "You can douse all the other books about new Who in lighter fuel and spark up your Zippo – this is all you need. It's the only one that opens a door into the brain of the series' showrunner." Darren Scott of The Pink Paper – which also awarded the book five stars – agreed: "If you're an uber fan of the show... or an aspiring (or even established) writer, this book will very, very quickly fall into the 'can't put down' category." Scott Matthewman of The Stage said, "I can't recommend The Writer's Tale highly enough... It's a genuine insight into the entire television production process." "The Writer's Tale is an enormous book, but consumed compulsively it doesn't last very long at all," said Thom Hutchinson of Death Ray magazine. "We learn, brilliantly, the difference between bellowing media personage Big Russell and the apprehensive, chain-smoking obsessive who exists alone and silent in the early hours." The Scotsman's team of arts writers said: "The Writer's Tale offers a fascinating insight into the writing of one of TV's biggest hits." Veronica Horwell of The Guardian called it "the Doctor Who Annual for adults", suggesting that 500-odd pages "is not nearly enough, should have been 1001 pages, because Davies doesn't need to be writing fiction, shaping stuff retrieved from the flux of his Great Maybe, to be a storyteller. He's the Scheherazade of Cardiff Bay." Horwell described Davies as "a total romantic about writing. It's his love, his drug, his force for change: over the year even invisible, unopinionated Cook emerges as a proper companion who challenges Davies over the last image in the series. And wins. Brilliant."

In the blogosphere, Sci-Fi Onlines Daniel Salter claimed that The Writer's Tale "could be one of the most important Doctor Who books you're ever likely to read, even if it's not always about Doctor Who." "Page after page of banter that's just as exciting and suspenseful as the show itself," enthused Sebastian J. Brook of Doctor Who Online. "Cook's fearless and intelligent approach to asking questions pave [sic] the way for some fantastic responses as he manages to temper Davies' fun, energetic and sometimes insecure narrative with good, solid and sometimes cheeky responses." Off The Tellys Graham Kibble-White concluded: "Candid, lucid and an all-too painful evocation of the challenges inherit in writing and running perhaps the most important show on the BBC".

In November 2008, it was announced that Richard and Judy, the couple credited with revolutionising the reading habits of Britons, had selected The Writer's Tale for their Christmas Presents book strand – in the Serious Non-Fiction category – as part of the prestigious Richard & Judy Book Club. The couple described the book as "an absolute snapshot into the mind of a creative writer... It's a free flow of thought – a stream of consciousness. It's a great book."

On 2 December 2008, inspired by The Writer's Tale, Charlie Brooker devoted an extended edition of his BBC Four TV show Screenwipe entirely to interviews with prestigious writers, including Russell T Davies.

In June 2009, The Writer's Tale was shortlisted in the "Best Non-Fiction" category at the 2009 British Fantasy Awards, but ultimately lost out to Stephen Jones' Basil Copper: A Life in Books.

Published in January 2010, the paperback edition, The Writer's Tale: The Final Chapter, updates Davies and Cook's correspondence to September 2009, to cover Davies' final year as Head Writer and Executive Producer of Doctor Who, taking in David Tennant's final few episodes as the Doctor. Critical reception was generally positive. SFX magazine's Ian Berriman described the book as "satisfyingly voyeuristic" and said, "It's well worth buying, even if you've already got the original edition." The Guardians Vera Rule called it "Far more than a ritual 'making of'" and the "Best masterclass in telly I've ever attended," adding: "Made me cry." Heat magazine included the book on its "Hot List" of "The Top Ten Things We At Heat Are Completely Obsessed With This Week." However, Private Eye criticised the tome for being "breathlessly self-congratulatory" – "a bring-your-own-extolment party in which readers are invited to bask in the outrageous genius of this bear-like TV demagogue."

Asked, in a February 2010 interview, whether there were any plans to conduct a similar correspondence with Davies' successor as showunner, Steven Moffat, Cook replied: Not at the moment. Well, not by me. Maybe Steven's e-mailing someone else! But look, e-mailing me isn't a prerequisite for taking the job of showrunner. I'm not handed down from head writer to head writer, like a soup recipe. Or a genetic disorder. The Writer's Tale sort of came about by accident, really, and it was quite an organic process, at a time when Russell already had three series under his belt...

 YouTube and other work 
On 16 August 2012, Cook released a trailer on his YouTube account ninebrassmonkeys for his project, Becoming YouTube, a 12-part "weekly" video series about the British YouTube community. Presented in a documentary style and incorporating sketch comedy and fantasy sequences featuring popular YouTube stars. The first episode was launched on 9 December 2012. After uploading the last episode of Becoming YouTube of the first series on 23 February 2014, he announced Project:Library, which is written by Cook, Tim Hautekiet and Jack Howard.

On 7 April 2013, Cook was featured in The Guardian in an article about Britain's 20 most popular video bloggers and about his success with Becoming YouTube. Cook is also involved with the development of Tofu, an 8-part sex-culture web series commissioned by Channel 4 to accompany the television productions Cucumber and Banana.

On 8 January 2015, Benjamin Cook has uploaded a trailer for the 2nd season of his project, Becoming YouTube, claimed to be the last in the series. He also conducted interviews with a number of YouTube personalities including Charlie McDonnell, Emma Blackery, Jack Howard, Daniel Howell, Phil Lester, amongst others.

 Tofu 

Tofu is a British online documentary series presented by Cook released in 2015 on 4oD, Channel 4's video-on-demand service. The series complements two series by Russell T Davies, Cucumber and Banana. Cook interviews the cast members and the public about modern sex, sexuality, and issues referenced or arisen in the 2 shows. Like Cucumber and Banana, the name of the series refers to the same urological scale of hardness of the male erection which starts at tofu, goes through peeled banana and banana, and ends at cucumber.

 Cook, Benjamin (2003). Doctor Who: The New Audio Adventures – The Inside Story. Berkshire: Big Finish. .
 Hickman, Clayton, ed. (2005), "Cook, Benjamin", Doctor Who Annual 2006, pp. 47–52. Kent: Panini Books. .
 Davies, Russell T; and Cook, Benjamin (2008). Doctor Who: The Writer's Tale. London: BBC Books. .
 Davies, Russell T; and Cook, Benjamin (2010). Doctor Who: The Writer's Tale: The Final Chapter. London: BBC Books. .
 Hickman, Clayton, ed. (2010), "Cook, Benjamin", The Brilliant Book of Doctor Who 2011, pp. 104–107. London: BBC Books. .
 Hickman, Clayton, ed. (2011), "Cook, Benjamin", The Brilliant Book of Doctor Who 2012'', pp. 10–14, 36–39, 64–67, 94–97, 154–159. London: BBC Books. .

References

External links 
 Official website
 Benjamin Cook on Twitter
 Benjamin Cook (ninebrassmonkeys) on YouTube

1982 births
British atheists
British feminists
British video bloggers
Living people
English video bloggers
English male journalists
People from Isleworth
Alumni of Collingwood College, Durham
Alumni of Richmond upon Thames College